Kyungpook National University (경북대학교, abbreviated as KNU or Kyungdae, 경대) is one of ten Flagship Korean National Universities representing Daegu Metropolitan City and Gyeongbuk Province in South Korea.  It is located in the Daegu Metropolitan City, which used to be the capital city of the Gyeongbuk Province, South Korea before being separated from the mother province.

Establishment 
Kyungpook National University was founded on September, 1946 by upgrading the Colleges of Education, Medicine and Agriculture in Daegu to the National College. In October, 1951, Colleges of Education, Medicine, Agriculture, Liberal Arts and Sciences, Law and Political Sciences combined into Kyungpook National University. Other departments including Engineering and Dentistry were established sequentially to create what is now known as Kyungpook National University.

Administration 
As of November 20, 2021, Won-hwa Hong is the university's President. He graduated from KNU Department of Architecture, and acquired masters and doctoral degree at Waseda University, Japan. President Hong served as KNU Dean of College of Engineering and Dean of Research & Industry Collaboration. There are two vice presidents in this university, Executive Vice President for academic affairs (Shi-Chul Lee) and Vice President for External Affairs (Sioh KIM). VP Lee is a two-time Fulbright Fellow and former KNU Dean of Academic Affairs, Shi-Chul Lee and VP Kim is former CEO of KNU Chilgok Hospital. Under the command of the president and the vice presidents, there are about 10 Deans in the administration: Deans of Academic Affairs; Student Affairs; Strategy & Finance; Research & Industry Collaboration; International Affairs; Admissions; External Cooperation; Information & Technology; Education Reform; Graduate School Policy, etc. Additionally, the Office of General Administration is in charge of personnel, budget, and facilities management.

Academics

Undergraduate colleges 

 College of Humanities
 College of Social Sciences
 College of Natural Sciences
 College of Economics and Business Administration
 College of Engineering
 College of Agriculture and Life Sciences
 College of Music and Visual Arts
 Teachers‘ College
 College of Veterinary Medicine
 College of Human Ecology
 College of Nursing
 College of IT Engineering
 College of Pharmacy
 Global Leaders School
 School of Public Administration
 Undeclared Major
 College of Ecology and Environmental Science
 College of Science and Engineering
 School of Health and Welfare

Graduate colleges 
 The Graduate School
 Graduate School of Education
 Graduate School of Public Administration
 Graduate School of Business Administration
 Graduate School of Public Health
 Graduate School of Industry
 Graduate School of Agricultural Development
 Graduate School of International Studies
 Graduate School of Policy and Information
 Graduate School of Forensic and Investigative Science
 Graduate School of Science and Technology
 School of Dentistry
 School of Medicine
 Law School

Rankings 

 Ranked 9th in Korea and 402nd globally in the 2021 university evaluation released by the World University Ranking Center(CWUR).   
 Ranked 7th in the Nation in 2021 Shanghai Jiao Tong University Evaluations 
 Ranked 93rd in Asia in the 2022 university evaluation released by Quacquarelli Symonds(QS) 
 Ranked 13th in the world and 1st in Korea in the 2022 Times Higher Education (THE) University Impact Rankings

Campus 
Kyungpook National University has four campuses in the Gyeongbuk province. The main campus, which houses the major engineering and science schools is located in the heart of Daegu city in the Buk-gu area. The Kyungpook National University also has separate campuses for its teaching hospital known as the Dongin campus as well as a campus at Samduk for its dental school and hospital. In addition, Kyungpook National University also functions from its Sangju campus.

Colleges and schools

See also
Kyungpook National University Museum
Flagship Korean National Universities
List of national universities in South Korea
List of universities and colleges in South Korea
Education in Korea

References 

 Korea Makes Strides in World University Rankings

External links 
 Kyungpook National University

 
1946 establishments in Korea
National universities and colleges in South Korea